The Chaco grass mouse (Akodon toba) is a species of rodent in the family Cricetidae.
It is found in Argentina, Bolivia, and Paraguay.

References

Musser, G. G. and M. D. Carleton. 2005. Superfamily Muroidea. pp. 894–1531 in Mammal Species of the World a Taxonomic and Geographic Reference. D. E. Wilson and D. M. Reeder eds. Johns Hopkins University Press, Baltimore.

Akodon
Mammals described in 1921
Taxa named by Oldfield Thomas
Taxonomy articles created by Polbot